Abraham Schrameck (26 November 1867 – 19 October 1948) was a French-Jewish politician, senator, Minister of the Interior, and colonial governor of French Madagascar.

Early life 
Schrameck was born to a family of Jewish merchants on 26 November 1867.

Career 
From 1925 to 1945, he was the Senator for Bouches-du-Rhone, and also served as Minister of the interior for seven months in 1925.

Interior minister 

In 1925, amid clashes between monarchists and communists, Schrameck ordered the prohibition of May Day and the Joan of Arc parade. The monarchists, led by the Action Française movement, ignored his order and continued to hold celebrations.

During his career,  he was subject to antisemitic harassment from the far-right, including Charles Maurras and Action Francaise.

Vichy regime 
While he initially voted in 1940 for "full powers" to be given to Vichy ruler Philippe Petain, this did not prevent him from being first placed under house arrest and then sentenced to internment a year later due to his Jewish background.

Books 

 Code pénitentiaire : recueil des actes et documents officiels intéressant les services et les établissements pénitentiaires
 Inauguration du monument élevé à la mémoire du général Galliéni à Tamatave, le 4 octobre 1918 : discours

See also 

 List of Jewish heads of state and government

External links 

 France Archives
 Data.bnf.fr'

References 

French interior ministers
Jewish French politicians
1867 births
1948 deaths
Colonial Governors of French Madagascar
Politicians from Saint-Étienne